Francesco Turrini (born 18 October 1965 in Foligno) is an Italian footballer who played as a right winger. He is a youth team coach for Parma.

Playing career
After a career entirely in Serie B with Sambenedettese, Parma, Como and Taranto before moving to Piacenza in 1992. He enjoyed two promotions to Serie A and earned a reputation as a skillful winger with an eye for goal.

He moved to Napoli in 1996 and would be seen as one of the better performers in a particularly bleak period for the club. He finished his career with Ancona.

Coaching career
After youth and senior roles at smaller clubs, Turrini joined the technical staff of Parma's two most senior youth sides.

References

External links
Career Stats

1965 births
Living people
Italian footballers
People from Foligno
A.S. Sambenedettese players
A.C. Ancona players
Parma Calcio 1913 players
Piacenza Calcio 1919 players
S.S.C. Napoli players
Taranto F.C. 1927 players
Como 1907 players
Serie A players
Serie B players
Footballers from Umbria
Association football midfielders
Sportspeople from the Province of Perugia